Teymuraz Gabashvili was the defending champion, but decided not to compete.

Nikoloz Basilashvili won the title, defeating Chase Buchanan in the final, 7–6(7–2), 6–2.

Seeds

Draw

Finals

Top half

Bottom half

References
 Main Draw
 Qualifying Draw

Karshi Challengerandnbsp;- Singles
2014 Singles